2016 Hokkaido Consadole Sapporo season.

J2 League

References

External links
 J.League official site

Hokkaido Consadole Sapporo
Hokkaido Consadole Sapporo seasons